Morchella pragensis, commonly known as the Prague morel, is a species of ascomycete fungus in the family Morchellaceae. Found in Europe, it was described as new to science in 1952 by Czech mycologist František Smotlacha.

References

External links

Fungi described in 1952
Fungi of Europe
pragensis